The Euro-Asia Cup, more recently known as the Asia-Euro Cup or Asia-Europe All Stars Challenge, is a table tennis team competition currently held annually in China between teams of professional players representing Asia and Europe.

History

First held in 1986 to 1989 with singles and team events, then re-held in 2009 with only team events, in 2009 to 2013 the competition featured two events each year: one held in China and the other held in a European city. Since 2013, there has just been one event held annually in China, currently organised by the Chinese Table Tennis Association.

Asia has won the competition nine times, compared to Europe's three wins. The European team's first two wins came in Turkey and France, and in 2015 they earned their first competition win on Asian soil, with victory in Zhangjiagang.

Winners

Individual events (1986–1989)

Men's singles

Women's singles

Team events (2009–present)

Results

2009 – Asia

Asia defeated Europe 6–4 on aggregate

2009 – Europe

Europe defeated Asia 6–5 on aggregate

2010 – Asia

Asia defeated Europe 6–5 on aggregate

2010 – Europe

Asia defeated Europe 6–4 on aggregate

2011 – Asia

2011 – Europe

2012 – Asia

2012 – Europe

2013

2014

2015

2016

See also
Asian Table Tennis Union
European Table Tennis Union

References

External links 
European Table Tennis Union
Asian Table Tennis Union
Chinese Table Tennis Association (in Chinese)

Table tennis competitions
Table tennis in Asia
Table tennis in Europe